Dariganga may refer to:

 Dariganga Mongols, an eastern Mongol ethnic subgroup
 Dariganga, Sükhbaatar, a sum (district) in the Sükhbaatar aimag in Mongolia